The Main Event is the debut album by Fingathing. It was released in 2000 on Grand Central Records.

Production
The album was produced by Fingathing's DJ Peter Parker and Sneaky; Parker provided the scratching, and Sneaky played double bass.  Many of the tracks are about wrestling.

Critical reception
AllMusic wrote that "it's rare that discs released by scratch or battle DJs ever hold a candle to their respective live performances, but here Fingathing definitely defy convention." The Guardian wrote that some of the songs "are lushly atmospheric, while others have the rudimentary feel and brutal minimalism of earliest hip hop."

Track listing
 "Intro"  – 0:43
 "Check It Out"  – 2:58
 "Big Monsters Crush Cities"  – 5:56
 "Come On Girls"  – 1:50
 "Head To Head"  – 4:08
 "How To Smoke" (featuring DJ Noize)  – 4:11
 "Slappy's Tune"  – 2:22
 "Just Practice" (featuring Mr. Scruff)  – 3:52
 "Big Kid"  – 2:40
 "Remember This?"  – 0:48
 "You Fly Me"  – 3:11
 "Ffathead"  – 3:20
 "Slippin" (featuring Veba)  – 5:14
 "A Light Refreshment"  – 1:11
 "Crowd Pleasers" (featuring DJ Noize)  – 3:42
 "Ffling"  – 3:42
 "The Final Bout"  – 5:07

References

Grand Central Records albums
Fingathing albums
2000 albums